Ojaotsa springs, also known as Serga springs are springs in Meremäe village in Estonia. They are the source for Tuhkvitsa Stream. Springs might potentially be rising springs forming a travertine deposit. Ojaotsa springs belong to the pre-selection of Natura 2000 nature conservation areas, they have 10 openings of groundwater and a rate of flow of 150 litres per second.

References

Setomaa Parish
Springs of Estonia